David Lean may refer to:

David Lean (1908–1991), an English film director, producer, screenwriter and editor
David Lean (athlete) (1935-), an Australian athlete
David Lean (politician) (1945-), an Australian politician

See also
(7037) Davidlean, a main-belt asteroid discovered in 1995, named for English film director David Lean.